= Gherapalgad =

Village in Maharashtra

- Village
- Interactive map of Gherapalgad
- Country: India
- State: Maharashtra

Gherapalgad is a small village in Ratnagiri district, Maharashtra state in Western India. The 2011 Census of India recorded a total of 901 residents in the village. Gherapalgad's geographical area is approximately 971 hectares (2,400 acres).
